Jorkens Has a Large Whiskey is a collection of fantasy short stories, narrated by Mr. Joseph Jorkens, by writer Lord Dunsany. It was first published in London by Putnam in September, 1940.  It was the third collection of Dunsany's Jorkens tales to be published. It has also been issued in combination with the fourth book, The Fourth Book of Jorkens, in the omnibus edition The Collected Jorkens, Volume Two, published by Night Shade Books in 2004.

As noted by S. T. Joshi and many book dealers, this volume was and remains very scarce.

The book collects twenty-six short pieces by Dunsany.

Contents
 "Preface"
 "Jorkens' Revenge"
 "Jorkens Retires from Business"
 "Jorkens Handles a Big Property"
 "The Invention of Dr. Caber"
 "The Grecian Singer"
 "The Jorkens Family Emeralds"
 "A Fishing Story"
 "Jorkens in High Finance"
 "The Sign"
 "The Angelic Shepherd"
 "The Neapolitan Ice"
 "The Development of the Rillswood Estate"
 "The Fancy Man"
 "The Lion and the Unicorn"
 "A Doubtful Story"
 "Jorkens Looks Forward"
 "Jorkens Among the Ghosts"
 "Elephant Shooting"
 "African Magic"
 "Jorkens Consults a Prophet"
 "A Matter of Business"
 "The Invention of the Age"
 "The Sultan, the Monkey and the Banana"
 "Pundleton's Audience"
 "The Fight in the Drawing-Room"
 "The Ivory Poacher"

References

External links
 

1940 short story collections
Fantasy short story collections
Short story collections by Edward Plunkett, 18th Baron of Dunsany
G. P. Putnam's Sons books